LRT Radijas is the public-owned Lithuanian radio station.

LRT Radijas 

Lithuanian Radio has been on air now for more than 80 years, and today it operates 3 radio channels – LRT Radijas, LRT Klasika and LRT Opus.

LRT Radijas is being transmitted on the FM waves.

The station offers news, current affairs, culture, religious, sport, entertainment and music programmes. The LRT Radijas News has its correspondents not only in the largest cities of Lithuania, but also in regions. It is the only radio news service with such an extensive network of associates abroad – from the United States to Moscow.

External links

Radio in Lithuania
Radio stations in Lithuania